How Democracy Works Now: Twelve Stories is a 12-part documentary film series that examines the American political system through the lens of immigration reform during 2001–2007. The films were directed and produced by award-winning filmmaking team Shari Robertson and Michael Camerini.

How Democracy Works Now premiered on HBO with the broadcast debut of The Senators' Bargain on March 24, 2010. A directors' cut of The Senators' Bargain was featured in the 2010 Human Rights Watch Film Festival at Lincoln Center, with the theatrical title Last Best Chance. The second story in the 12-part series, Mountains and Clouds, opened the festival in the same year. The films are touring the United States as part of the Human Rights Watch traveling film festival, and have been exhibited in special events at Columbia University, the Five College Consortium, Georgia College and State University, CUNY and other universities. Since its debut the series has become an important resource for advocates, policy-makers and educators.

Release schedule

Reception
How Democracy Works Now films have received a positive response, including reviews from The New York Times, The Boston Globe, Reuters, Congress.org, New American Media and Newsweek. Publications have cited the films as important resources for advocates and policy makers. Variety said the films had the potential to "help change hearts and minds".

Touring schedule
Story 12: Last Best Chance is currently a part of the  Human Rights Watch Film Festival, where it continues to receive positive reviews. In advance of its March 24, 2011 screening at Yerba Buena Center for the Arts (YBCA) The San Francisco Chronicle called the film the "heart" of the traveling festival and in many ways "the most chilling... [at] the festival" for chronicling "human rights that are being abused in the United States."

Story 12: Last Best Chance along with Story 2: Mountains and Clouds screenings in June 2010 with the Festival at Lincoln Center were reviewed as "mandatory for whoever wants to learn about the democratic process and the working of Washington’s political elite."

See also
 Well-Founded Fear

References

External links

Documentary films about American politics
Documentary films about immigration to the United States